Tarata Municipality is the first municipal section of the Esteban Arce Province in the Cochabamba Department, Bolivia. Its capital is Tarata. At the time of census 2001 the municipality had 8,715 inhabitants. Along with neighboring municipalities such as Arbieto, Cliza, Tolata, and Punata, much of its population lives abroad, mainly in Argentina, Spain, Italy, and the Washington DC area in the United States.

Subdivision 
Tarata Municipality is divided into four cantons.

Languages 
The languages spoken in the Tarata Municipality are mainly Quechua and Spanish.

References

External links 
 Population data and map of Tarata Municipality

Municipalities of the Cochabamba Department